Ahmed Touba (born 13 March 1998) is an Algerian professional footballer who plays as a left back or left winger for Süper Lig club İstanbul Başakşehir and Algeria national football team.

Club career 
Touba is a youth exponent from Brugge. He made his senior debut on 1 May 2017 in the Belgian Pro League against SV Zulte Waregem. He replaced José Izquierdo after 80 minutes.

On 30 June 2022, Touba signed for İstanbul Başakşehir on a 3 year contract with an additional optional year.

International career
Born in France, Touba is of Algerian descent. He moved to Belgium at a young age, and was a youth international for Belgium. He represented the Algeria national team in a friendly 4–1 win over Mauritania on 3 June 2021.

References

External links
 

1998 births
Living people
Sportspeople from Roubaix
Algerian footballers
Belgian footballers
French footballers
Association football defenders
Algeria international footballers
Belgium youth international footballers
Belgium under-21 international footballers
French emigrants to Belgium
Naturalised citizens of Belgium
Belgian people of Algerian descent
French sportspeople of Algerian descent
Club Brugge KV players
Oud-Heverlee Leuven players
PFC Beroe Stara Zagora players
RKC Waalwijk players
İstanbul Başakşehir F.K. players
Belgian Pro League players
Challenger Pro League players
First Professional Football League (Bulgaria) players
Eredivisie players
Algerian expatriate footballers
Belgian expatriate sportspeople in Bulgaria
Expatriate footballers in Bulgaria
Belgian expatriate sportspeople in the Netherlands
Expatriate footballers in the Netherlands
Belgian expatriate sportspeople in Turkey
Expatriate footballers in Turkey
Footballers from Hauts-de-France
Algerian expatriate sportspeople in Bulgaria
Algerian expatriate sportspeople in the Netherlands
Algerian expatriate sportspeople in Turkey